A sense of wonder is a feeling of awe that can be inspired by, for example, reading science fiction.

The Sense of Wonder can refer to:

Music 
 Sense of Wonder (1987-), a Japanese progressive rock band.
 A Sense of Wonder (1985), an album by Van Morrison.
 "S.O.W. Sense of Wonder" (2010), a single from the Japanese idol group Idoling
 "Sense of Wonder" (2007), a song on No Hurt Like a Broken Heart by rock band Palm Springs.
 "Sense of Wonder}" (2011), a song on Star by Rip Slyme

Films and television 
 The Sense of Wonder (2015),  a French romance film written and directed by Éric Besnard.
 A Sense of Wonder 2010, a film written by Kaiulani Lee and directed by Christopher Monger.
 A Sense Of Wonder (1986), a documentary directed by Barnaby Thompson.
 The Sense of Wonder (1951), an episode of Out There.
 "The sense of Wonder" (2010), an episode of the anime series Gurren Lagann.
 The Sense of Wonder (1956), an episode of X Minus One.

Publications 
 Sense of Wonder Press, a publisher.
 A Sense of Wonder, a book by Marie Rodell about environmentalist Rachel Carson.
 A Sense of Wonder (1977)), a book by Edgar J. Saxon* A Sense of Wonder: Samuel R. Delany, Race, Identity, and Difference (2004), a book by Jeffrey Allen Tucker
 A Sense of Wonder: On Reading and Writing Books for Children (1995), a non-fiction book by Katherine Paterson.
 A Sense of Wonder: The Photography of Roger Camp (1987) a photography book by Roger Camp.
 Sense of Wonder an unpublished book by Calvin Thomas Beck.
 A Sense of Wonder (2002), a book by Haydn Washington.
 Sense of Wonder (2003), a short story by Gordon Eklund.
 Sense of Wonder (2010), a short story by Richard A. Lovett.

 Other uses 
 Sense of Wonder Night (1996–), a video game expo held annually in Japan.
 Sense of Wonder, a fanzine of Bill Schelly.
 A Sense of Wonder, an exhibit at the Milwaukee Public Museum.
 A Sense of Wonder (2016), an exhibition of paintings by Julian Brown.
 Sense of Wonder (2001), an exhibition of photograps by Tal Shochat.
 Sense of Wonder a painting by Bryan Larsen.

 See also 
 "Never Lose Your Sense of Wonder" (2005), a single by English rock band Yeti
 Travel and the Sense of Wonder (1992), a travelogue by John Malcolm Brinnin
 The Non-Fictional Sense of Wonder (2011), an essay by Sandra Tayler.
 Three Stories (1967) (a.k.a. A Sense of Wonder, The Moon Era), a science fiction anthology by Sam Moskowitz.
 "Blues Subtitled No Sense of Wonder" (1998), a song on Camoufleur by  American indie rock band Gastr del Sol.
 Sense of Wonder Motivates VLSI Chip Revolutionary (2020), an article by Lynn Conway.
 Sense of Wonder Trail, a nature center in Iowa.
 Sense of Wonder Nature Center, a nature center in Florida.
 Freedom from God: Restoring the Sense of Wonder'' (2002), a book by Harry Willson.
 "Oh, That Lost Sense of Wonder!" (1958), a poem by Isaac Asimov.